This is a list of wapentakes in Yorkshire.

North Riding of Yorkshire

East Riding of Yorkshire

West Riding of Yorkshire

Ainsty and the City of York

As York acted as the capital of Yorkshire and it is right in the centre at the junction of the three ridings, it (along with the wapentake of Ainsty) had its own neutral area, which was not part of any of the three ridings.

 
Yorkshire
Wapentakes